The Ningbo Daily is a Chinese newspaper published in Ningbo, Zhejiang, China.

History
The newspaper was  founded on 8 August 1949 under the name Yongjiang Daily as the official newspaper of the Ningbo Prefectural Committee of the Communist Party of China. In July 1950, Yongjiang Daily merged with Ningbo People's Daily and changed its name to Ningbo Times. In September 1951, Ningbo Times was renamed Ningbo Dazhong, and in October 1972, it ceased publication. After the 3rd Plenary Session of the 11th Central Committee of the Chinese Communist Party, Ningbo News resumed publication on 1 June 1980, and was co-sponsored by the Ningbo Municipal Committee of the Communist Party of China. On New Year's Day 1983, Ningbo News changed its name to Ningbo Daily.

After the establishment of Ningbo Daily Newspaper Group on 21 June 2002, Ningbo Daily was changed to be owned by Ningbo Daily Newspaper Group. At present, Ningbo Daily is a large newspaper with more than 12 editions, with a circulation of 250,000 copies.

In 2018, the newspaper was included in the recommended list of the top 100 national newspapers in 2017 by the National Radio and Television Administration.

Controversies
During the 2012 protests against the PX project in Zhenhai District, Ningbo, the Ningbo Daily published an article claiming that citizen demonstrations undermined the stability and development of the overall situation, causing dissatisfaction among the demonstrators.

References

Newspapers published in Ningbo
1949 establishments in China
Publications established in 1949
Daily newspapers published in China